The  is an opera company located in Tokyo, Japan, and is notably that nation's first and oldest professional opera company.

Historical overview
It was founded in 1934 by operatic tenor Yoshie Fujiwara. Following World War II the company entered a period of great success, beginning with a highly popular production of Giuseppe Verdi's La traviata which was given more than 400 performances under the baton of Manfred Gurlitt. Renowned tenor Arrigo Pola was the company's Artistic Director between 1957 and 1965. After he left the company went into a period of decline, but eventually the company began to thrive again beginning in the late 1970s. Since 1980 the company has been managed by the Japan Opera Foundation, an organization which also manages the Nihon Opera Kyokai.

References

External links
Official Website of the Japan Opera Foundation

Japanese opera companies
Musical groups established in 1934
1934 establishments in Japan
Music in Tokyo